Lusa may refer to:

 Lusa (village), India
 Lusa language
 Lusa News Agency, the official news agency of Portugal
 Lusa submachine gun, a compact 9×19mm Parabellum submachine gun developed by INDEP of Portugal in 1983
 Lusa, a black bear in the series Seekers by Erin Hunter